Garforth House is a grade I listed building in York, England.

The house lies at 54 Micklegate, in the city centre.  The site was occupied by two tenements in early-18th century, one of which was purchased by William Garforth, and the other by his nephew, Edmund Garforth.  In the 1750s, they cleared the site for the construction of Garforth House, which is generally believed to have been designed by John Carr of York.  It was completed around 1757, and Edmund lived there with his wife, Elizabeth, but they soon began letting it out.  In 1831, it was sold to Barnard Hague.

In 1912, St Margaret's Independent Grammar School for Girls, a small religious school, moved into the building.  It remained at the site until it closed, in 1968, after which the building was used as offices.  In 2010, it was sold and reconverted to residential use.

The house is of three stories, and its brick front was originally symmetrical, although the door on the right of the ground floor was later replaced by a window.  It has stone quoins, and in its pediment is an oculus window.  Its original lamp brackets survive, while balconies were added to the second floor windows in the 19th-century.  The rear is of a lighter brick, and has an original drainpipe.  Inside, the three floors above ground have richly decorated rooms utilising marble, many of which had original fireplaces.  It has an unusual plan for the period, based on an "H" shape, with the main staircase at the rear, and a large saloon on the first floor overlooking the garden.

References

Grade I listed buildings in York
Houses completed in 1757
Houses in North Yorkshire
Micklegate